Ejin River, also Etsin Gol, Ruo Shui or Ruo He in ancient times, is a major river system of northern China. The river forms one of the largest inland deltas or alluvial fans in the world.

History
About 2,000 years ago, the river was said to have a much more abundant flow than it does today and thus its perennial reaches stretched much farther out into the desert than it does today. Parts of the river flow through the Hexi Corridor, a valley which once formed a significant portion of the Silk Road. The upper section of the river, also known as the Heihe (or 'Black River'), was first settled by the Chinese in about 100 B.C. Many outposts were created to protect Silk Road traders from the frequent attacks of barbarians, as the water-abundant valley of the river in relation with the aridity of the surrounding terrain provided an easy route for Huns and Mongols to launch raids. Since then, the river valley has been intensely cultivated and logged. However, clearing of the landscape has caused increased erosion, leading to desertification of the region and a gradual reduction of the river flow.

The lower part of the river was once confused to be the middle reach of the Yellow River, which lies farther east but flows for a significant distance in the same direction paralleling the Ruo River.

The former Tangut city of Khara-Khoto, now deserted, lies near the lower end of the river. According to legend, the city was abandoned after Ming forces diverted the river away from the city in 1372.

European explorers that visited the area include Pyotr Kuzmich Kozlov (1907–1909) and John DeFrancis (1935).

In the 20th century, China's main spaceport, the Jiuquan Satellite Launch Center was constructed in the lower course of the Ruo Shui, with launch pads on both sides of the river.

Basin characterization
The basin subdivision reflects the different hydrological dynamics typical of the numerous natural contexts to be found within the basin. Most of the population is found in the midstream area, together with the oases and the agricultural consortia.

Upstream area
The main course of the river starts in the Qilian mountains at an elevation of 3650 m asl. The loamy sediment load gives the waters a dark colour which, during time, has contributed to the river being described as Hei (黑), that is Black. The orography in this part is obviously quite steep, with elevation peaks up to 5544 m asl and vegetation mainly made up of wild shrubs. Most of the precipitation fallen annually over the basin is concentrated in this area, creating two main river courses that join just north of the hydrometric station of Yingluo.

Midstream area
The midstream area is characterized by the presence of wide ranges of cultivated fields, mainly in the oases that follow the principal route of the river. The city of Zhangye, main centre of the region, is located next to a wide north-west bend of the river. The high population (940 in/km² in 2015) and croplands density implies a high water demand, estimated at /year in the 2001–2012 time frame. This demand is mainly satisfied using the river (71%) and groundwater (29%).
Notwithstanding the water influx from the rivers descending from the north-west side of the Qilian mountains, the total balance of the river in this part is negative (that is more water is lost than acquired).

Downstream area
After the stream gauge at Zhengyi, the river describes a wide north-east turn, developing its last 400 km in the western fringe of the Badain Jaran Desert. Apart from the physiological riparian vegetation, this last part of the hydrological basin is mainly desertic, and the water losses caused by both evaporation and deep percolation cause the water flux to weaken. This pattern has caused the river to be named Ruo (弱, Weak). After the Langxinshan stream gauge, the river splits into two entities: the Dong He (東河, Eastern river) and the Xi He (西河, Western river) that follow on in the desert for another 220 km before emptying into two terminal lakes, the Sogo Nur and the Gaxun Nur, respectively, collectively forming the Juyan Lake Basin. The delta is made of the alluvial fan of the river itself, crossed by hundreds of dry channels entrenched by the river during its frequent course changes. Because the climate of the area has followed a drying trend over the past 10,000 years or so, the delta is no longer considered active (i.e. deposits are not being built up significantly) and is slowly being eroded by wind and water action.

Hydrological balance components
The analysis of the different components of the hydrological balance in the three main areas of the basin allows to distinguish the different geoclimatic mechanisms at work.

The hydrological balance, in its most complete version and formulate for a generic sub-basin, is structured as follows: .

Most of the precipitation is found in the upstream area, also showing a positive correlation with elevation. The evapotranspiration volumes are almost the same notwithstanding the high area difference among the three areas because of the consistent vegetation presence in the upstream (wild shrubs) and midstream (croplands) areas. In the  term, when shifting from the vegetated (upstream and midstream) to the arid (downstream) areas, the transpiration element decreases in importance in favour of the simple evaporation. The volumetric balances, instead, show different signs: in the mountain area the input-over-output excess can be explained with the important precipitation volumes; in the midstream area the cultivations require a great amount of water that is extracted from the aquifers, increasing the water deficit; finally, in the downstream area the positive effects of the water replenishment programme of the Chinese government are visible in the increase of the stored water volume in the 2001–2012 period.

Hydrometry
Along the river course a series of stream gauges are located. For each, the following table states position and average of the (yearly cumulated) discharge.

Following the available discharge data, a flow increase is present in the upstream area (up until Yingluoxia), followed by gradually decreasing values in the midstream area. This flow weakening is the result of the net balance between the tributaries descending from the north-east side of the Qilian Shan and the considerable derivations related to the cropfield area.

See also
List of rivers of China
Shule River
Tarim River
Weak River (mythology)

References

Rivers of Gansu
Rivers of Inner Mongolia